Konya Technical University is a public research university in Konya, Turkey. It was established on 18 May 2018.

References

Education in Konya
State universities and colleges in Turkey
Educational institutions established in 2018
2018 establishments in Turkey